The Non-Aligned Foreign Ministers Conference was held in Georgetown, Guyana from 8 August to 12 August 1972.

It was attended by delegations from 59 Non-Aligned Movement member countries, 12 delegations of observers and 8 guests. The Royal Government of National Union of Cambodia was recognized as the sole legitimate representative of Cambodia and to the Provisional Revolutionary Government of the Republic of South Viet Nam was admitted as a full member. Delegates from Indonesia, Malaysia, and Lao staged a protest walk-out to convey dissatisfaction with this decision. China's renewed interest in the movement was tied with growing need for support against the USSR, and returning the favor for admission to the United Nations, with votes mostly coming from non-aligned nations. 

The conference adopted an Action Programme for Economic Co-operation called the "Georgetown Declaration". The meeting included a call for resolution in the Middle East and the withdrawal of Israel from Arab territories. Also, a proposal was endorsed for a meeting of non-aligned ministers prior to any United Nations General Assembly meetings in order to "coordinate their positions" as well as establish annual meetings of heads of state.

The Umana Yana, a conical palm hut (benab), was erected for as a V.I.P. lounge and recreation centre.

Commemorative statue 
During the conference, the Non-aligned Monument to the four founders of the Non-Aligned Movement - President Nasser of Egypt, President Kwame Nkrumah of Ghana, Jawaharlal Nehru of India and President Josip Broz Tito of Yugoslavia - was erected in Company Path Garden and was unveiled by the then President, Arthur Chung. Each bust was sculpted in the home country of their likeness, and the quartz base from the Mazaruni area, and decorated with jasper from Orinduik Falls.

References 

Non-Aligned Movement
Diplomatic conferences in Guyana
20th-century diplomatic conferences
1972 in Guyana
20th century in Georgetown, Guyana
1972 conferences
1972 in international relations
Foreign Ministers